Guillermo Arenas (born 22 February 1963) is a Spanish former professional racing cyclist. He rode in the 1986 Tour de France.

References

External links

1963 births
Living people
Spanish male cyclists
People from Laviana